Leptospira alexanderi is a species of Leptospira. Its type strain is strain L 60T (= ATCC 700520T).

References

Further reading

External links

alexanderi
Bacteria described in 1999